Samson is a Polish coat of arms. It was used by several  szlachta families in the times of the Polish–Lithuanian Commonwealth.

Notable bearers
Notable bearers of this coat of arms include:
Henryk Samsonowicz
Felix Dzerzhinsky

See also
 Polish heraldry
 Heraldry
 Coat of arms

References

Polish coats of arms